Johannes ("Jan") Hermannus van Dijk (born 10 December 1956 in Schalkhaar, Deventer, Overijssel) is a retired Dutch footballer and manager. He currently manages Hoofdklasse side Chevremont.

Playing career

Club
Van Dijk is best known for having spent his entire career at FC Groningen, except for a short loan spell to Go Ahead Eagles. His stay with the club spanned from 1975 to 1992, and earned him the nickname "Mister FC Groningen", as well as the record for number of appearances with a Groningen jersey (537).

Coaching career
After he retired in 1992, Van Dijk became a football manager. He coached FC Groningen, Roda JC, RBC Roosendaal, Helmond Sport, and FC Emmen. He was fired from FC Emmen on 15 February 2007. After a season serving as Foeke Booy assistant at Al-Nassr, he was appointed manager of then-Eerste Divisie club VVV-Venlo in June 2008. Under his tenure, VVV-Venlo were crowned 2008–09 Eerste Divisie champions and achieved immediate promotion back to the Eredivisie. He was successively dismissed in December 2010 due to poor results.

In March 2012 it was announced Van Dijk would become manager of Topklasse amateurs VV Gemert on a two-year deal valid from the 2012–13 season. After suffering relegation on the first season of his in charge, Van Dijk and Gemert agreed to mutually part company in May 2013.

In March 2014 Van Dijk agreed to return to Helmond Sport, agreeing on a deal effective from 1 July 2014. He left the club in February 2016.

He was named manager at amateur side Chevremont for the 2017/18 season.

Personal life
Two of his sons, Gregoor and Dominique, also played professional football in the Netherlands. He is married to Ineke and he has two more sons and two daughters.

References

External links
 Profile 
 FC Groningen profile 

1956 births
Living people
Footballers from Deventer
Association football midfielders
Dutch footballers
FC Groningen players
Go Ahead Eagles players
Eredivisie players
Eerste Divisie players
Dutch football managers
FC Groningen managers
Roda JC Kerkrade managers
Helmond Sport managers
RBC Roosendaal managers
FC Emmen managers
VVV-Venlo managers
Eredivisie managers
Eerste Divisie managers
Dutch expatriate sportspeople in Saudi Arabia